LaGerald Montrell Vick (born January 12, 1997) is an American professional basketball player for Club Atlético Olimpia of the Liga Uruguaya de Básquetbol (LUB).

College career
Vick is a native of Memphis, Tennessee. He originally committed to SMU and SMU head coach Larry Brown, but on May 17, 2015, Vick committed to the Kansas Jayhawks and KU head coach Bill Self. As a freshman, he played in 19 games and averaged 4.8 minutes and 2.1 points per game. He was named to the 2015–16 Academic All-Big 12 Rookie Team. He became part of the rotation as a sophomore, playing in 36 games, averaging 7.4 points, 3.5 rebounds, and 37 percent shooting from three-point range.

As a junior, Vick played in 39 games and averaged 12.2 points, 4.8 rebounds and 2.1 assists, while shooting 37.3% from three-point range on the 2018 Final Four Team. He had averaged 17 points through the first 12 games. In the second round of the 2018 NCAA tournament, Vick scored 13 points on 5-of-9 shooting and collected four rebounds in a win over Seton Hall Pirates. He was named an All-Big 12 Honorable Mention selection after his junior season.

Following his junior season, Vick announced he would enter the 2018 NBA draft, but later withdrew his name. He was initially undecided on if he would return Kansas, play in the NBA G League, or transfer schools; however, on June 29, 2018, Vick announced he would return to Kansas.

As a senior in 2018–19, Vick was named Big 12 player of the week on November 19, 2018. In games against the Louisiana Ragin' Cajuns and Vermont Catamounts, he scored 33 and 32 points respectively. He hit 15 3-pointers in the two games, which set a Kansas Jayhawks record for most 3-pointers made in consecutive games. On January 12, 2019, he scored his 1,000 career point as a college player against the Baylor Bears. On February 8, 2019, it was announced that Vick would be taking a leave of absence to handle personal issues. For the season, he averaged 14.5 points, 4.0 rebounds, 1.5 steals, and 1.9 assists a game, while shooting 46.1% on three pointers.

Professional career
In October 2021, Vick moved to Colombia to play for Team Cali in the Baloncesto Profesional Colombiano. In 13 games between October 24 and November 18, he averaged 17.5 points, 5.8 rebounds, 2.2 assists and 1.8 steals per game.

In March 2022, Vick moved to Mexico to play for Astros de Jalisco in the Circuito de Baloncesto de la Costa del Pacífico (CIBACOPA). He helped the team win its first league title and was named an All-Star. In 49 games, he averaged 13.6 points, 4.3 rebounds and 1.6 assists per game.

In July 2022, Vick moved to Venezuela to play for Spartans Distrito Capital in the Superliga Profesional de Baloncesto. In 12 games between July 23 and September 14, he averaged 13.4 points, 4.8 rebounds, 2.7 assists and 1.3 steals per game.

In January 2023, Vick moved to Uruguay to play for Club Atlético Olimpia in the Liga Uruguaya de Básquetbol.

National team career
In 2015, Vick won gold with the USA University National Team at the World University Games in South Korea. In eight games, he averaged 4.5 points and 2.3 rebounds per game.

Career statistics

College

|-
| style="text-align:left;"| 2015–16
| style="text-align:left;"| Kansas
|| 19 || 0 || 4.8 || .560 || .471 || .500 || .3 || .4 || .2 || .1 || 2.1
|-
| style="text-align:left;"| 2016–17 
| style="text-align:left;"| Kansas
|| 36 || 6 || 24.4 || .443 || .370 || .826 || 3.5 || .9 || .6 || .4 || 7.4
|-
| style="text-align:left;"| 2017–18 
| style="text-align:left;"| Kansas 
|| 39 || 35 || 33.1 || .488 || .373 || .673 || 4.8 || 2.1 || .9 || .3 || 12.1
|-
| style="text-align:left;"| 2018–19
| style="text-align:left;"| Kansas
|| 23 || 20 || 33.0 || .476 || .455 || .767 || 4.0 || 1.9 || 1.2 || .2 || 14.1
|- class="sortbottom"
| style="text-align:center;" colspan="2"| Career
|| 117 || 61 || 25.8 || .475 || .405 || .737 || 3.5 || 1.4 || .7 || .3 || 9.4

References

External links
Kansas Jayhawks bio
LaGerald Vick on Twitter

1997 births
Living people
African-American basketball players
American expatriate basketball people in Colombia
American expatriate basketball people in Mexico
American expatriate basketball people in Venezuela
American men's basketball players
Astros de Jalisco players
Basketball players from Memphis, Tennessee
Kansas Jayhawks men's basketball players
Shooting guards
Spartans Distrito Capital players
Universiade medalists in basketball
Universiade gold medalists for the United States
Medalists at the 2015 Summer Universiade
21st-century African-American sportspeople